"In Control" is the fourth episode of the first season of the period drama television series The Americans. It originally aired on FX in the United States on February 20, 2013.

Plot
Ronald Reagan is shot. KGB agents Philip (Matthew Rhys) and Elizabeth Jennings (Keri Russell) find out by watching TV after spending the afternoon in a hotel room together. FBI agents Stan Beeman (Noah Emmerich) and Chris Amador (Maximiliano Hernández) are practicing speaking Russian when they hear the news. Agent Frank Gaad (Richard Thomas) tells Stan that he needs to find out if the assassin John Hinckley, Jr. is working with the KGB, and tells him to meet with his informant Nina (Annet Mahendru).

James Brady is falsely declared dead by several news broadcasters as Elizabeth is told by her KGB handler Claudia (Margo Martindale) to prepare for Operation Christopher – a code name for Russian agents engaging in guerrilla warfare in the event of a coup. Claudia informs her that she does not believe the KGB were behind the shooting.

Nina, hearing word from Stan, makes an excuse to KGB Resident Vasili Nikolaievich (Peter Von Berg), about spying on congressional aides. Vasili lets her go, but has her followed. Stan notices this as they are about to meet, and walks right past her. They eventually meet up later where Nina tells him that everyone at the Embassy believes Alexander Haig is staging a coup.

Philip hears from a nurse who treated Reagan in the hospital that he is expected to survive. They inform The Centre about this, but are still told to map out targets. Philip and Elizabeth stakeout Caspar Weinberger's house, but are interrupted by a security officer patrolling the streets. Elizabeth is forced to kill the officer after he tells her that he needs to run a police check on the van they are using. They listen to a recording from Weinberger's office, where they learn Haig may have the codes for the U.S.'s nuclear missiles. Philip suggests they find out more to confirm the information, but Elizabeth says they already need to report it back to The Centre. Philip tells her that her commitment to the mission is blinding her judgment.

Philip and Elizabeth find out from Stan that Hinckley has nothing to do with the KGB and that he is mentally unbalanced. Philip sends a message to Moscow to update them. Later, Elizabeth apologizes for not listening to him. Philip fears that Moscow will find out that they withheld the questionable information about Haig having the nuclear football. They both decide to keep it a secret.

Production
The episode was written by Joel Fields and series creator Joe Weisberg and directed by Jean de Segonzac.

Reception
In its original American broadcast on February 20, 2013, "In Control" was watched by 1.91 million viewers, according to Nielsen ratings.

The A.V. Club gave the episode a B+, complimenting the plot of the episode and the incorporation of the lead characters in the real-life event, stating: "What’s fascinating to me is the way that the show erects an incredibly convincing false history around actual events (like Alexander Haig coming into possession of the nuclear football), then uses it to illuminate the marriage of Phillip and Elizabeth."

References

External links
 

The Americans (season 1) episodes
2013 American television episodes
Television episodes directed by Jean de Segonzac